Sheard is a surname. Notable people with the surname include:

Charles Sheard (1857–1929), medical doctor, public health official and politician
Jabaal Sheard (born 1989), American football defensive end
John Sheard, Canadian pianist, producer and arranger
Joseph Sheard (1813–1883), Canadian architect and politician
Karen Clark Sheard (born 1960), American gospel singer, musician, and songwriter
Kierra Sheard, American gospel recording artist
Les Sheard, English rugby union player and coach
Mia Sheard, Canadian pop singer-songwriter
Michael Sheard (1938–2005), Scottish actor who featured in a large number of films and TV programmes
Paul Sheard (born 1954), Australian economist
Rod Sheard, British-Australian architect
Sarah Sheard (born 1953), Canadian novelist
Titus Sheard (1841–1904), American businessman and politician
Tom Sheard (1889–1954), Manx motorcycle racer
Virna Sheard (1862–1943), Canadian poet and writer